Computing started in south America in 1957, when the first digital computer arrived in Chile. 1979, the Centro Latinoamericano de Estudios en Informática (es) was established in Caracas, Venezuela. During the 1980s, most Latin American universities incorporated computer programs. By the 1990s, research output in computing began to be significant.

20th century
In 1957, the first digital computer arrived in Chile after the CCU purchased a Univac to be delivered to Valparaiso. The machine was one of the first documented cases in the history of computer science in South America. During the 1970s, Project Cybersyn was created as an ambitious project to implement cybernetic socialism under the short-lived administration of Salvador Allende.

21st century
The Free Software Foundation Latin America exists to promote the use of free software in Latin America. In 2009, FSF founder Richard Stallman visited Buenos Aires during the concurrent Wikimania 2009 conference in order to promote free software. Stallman regularly gives speeches in Spanish and has visited Latin America multiples times since 2009.

In 2005, the Chilean government alongside the private IT sector started a program called "Mi Primer PC", with the idea of bringing low-cost PC to the general population. The program was heavily criticized at the time, mainly due to the fact that the computers offered were severely limited due to the usage of Windows XP Starter Edition.  This program is not related to the similarly called "Yo Elijo Mi PC" program, put in place during the presidency of Michelle Bachelet which aims to bring computers to primary school students in lower socio-economical classes. 

In 2011, the government of Venezuela adopted the Linux-based operating system Canaima as the default operating system for the Venezuelan public administration. The operating system has gained a strong foothold and is one of the most used Linux distributions in Venezuela, largely because of its incorporation in public schools. It is being used in large scale projects as "Canaima Educativo", a project aimed at providing school children with a basic laptop computer with educational software nicknamed Magallanes. Use of Canaima has been presented on international congresses about the use of open standards.

In 2015, Google announced that they would invest US$1 million in computer science in Latin America.Amazon has major telescopes in Chile.

See also
 History of computing hardware
 History of South America

References